Voyage à Ouaga, is a 2021 Congolese-French drama thriller film directed by Camille Mouyéké and co-produced by Maka Kotto, Xavier Letourneur, Aïssa Maïga and Elena Zoubkou. The film stars Eric Laugérias in the lead role whereas Maka Kotto, Xavier Letourneur, Aïssa Maïga and René Morard made supportive roles. The film revolves around Lionel, a young Frenchman, who lost everything after having just arrived in Cotonou, Benin during the riots in the city.

The film made its premier in 2001. The film received mixed reviews from critics and screened at many film festivals. In the same year, the film won the Audience Award at the Namur International Festival of French-Speaking Film. Then the film won the Award of the City of Ouagadougou at the Panafrican Film and Television Festival of Ouagadougou (FESPACO).

Cast
 Eric Laugérias as Lionel
 Maka Kotto as Zao
 Xavier Letourneur as Marcel
 Aïssa Maïga as Loutaya
 René Morard as Max
 Tom Ouedraogo as Sékou 
 Bénédicte Roy as Victoria

References

External links 
 

2001 films
French thriller films
Republic of the Congo films
2000s French films